OMG is the first single album by South Korean girl group NewJeans. The single album was released by ADOR, a subsidiary of Hybe Corporation, on January 2, 2023, and contains two tracks, including the lead single of the same name and "Ditto", a pre-release track which was released on December 19, 2022.

Background 
NewJeans released their first extended play New Jeans, which had a strong presence on charts globally and was met with commercial and critical success. In November 2022, Hybe Corporation, the parent company of ADOR, which is managed by Min Hee-jin, confirmed in an online briefing about the future of the company that the quintet would release a new single album in January.

Release and promotion 
On November 10, during Hybe Corporation's annual community briefing on YouTube, CEO Jiwon Park announced that NewJeans' are slated to return with the release of their first single album OMG on January 2, 2023. On the same day, it was revealed that the single album will consist of the title track that was already planned at the time of production for the group’s debut album New Jeans as well as a pre-release single which will be released on December 19. On December 12, the first teasers were released, which were inspired by '90s Christmas visuals. Both teasers show a rabbit hopping in the middle of the logo, meant to symbolize the group's fanbase, known as "bunnies". On the same day, the name of the pre-release track which was revealed to be "Ditto" was released.

Composition 
The single album contains two tracks, including the eponymous lead single and "Ditto". In a brief statement to South Korean media outlets, ADOR CEO Min Hee-jin told: "If the debut album showcased NewJeans' summer, this single album will be one that showcases NewJeans' winter.

Track listing

Charts

Weekly charts

Monthly charts

Certification and sales

Release history

References 

2023 EPs
Korean-language EPs
Hybe Corporation EPs
NewJeans EPs
Single albums